Baba Mehar din (1922 - 21 October 2012), better known as Chacha Pakistani or "Uncle Pakistan", was a Pakistani man who was known for his daily appearance, dressed in a kurta made of a Pakistani flag, at the flag hoisting ceremony at the border point of Wagha. He made the 40 km journey from his home at Chandrai each day by hitch-hiking.
   
Aged 90 he had remained unmarried, living with his nephews. Chacha's hometown was a village in Punjab called Chandrai where he was buried, wrapped in his beloved green and white flag.

Honors
Former president Pervez Musharraf sent him to Umrah on political quota. Furthermore, he was also awarded by many rangers and army officials.

References

1922 births
2012 deaths
People from Punjab, Pakistan
Punjabi people